This is a timeline containing events regarding the history of Kosovo.

Prehistory, Roman era – 13th century AD 

5500–4500 BC: The Neolithic archaeological culture of Vinča occupied a large area of Central Balkans.
 4th century BC: The establishment of the Dardanian Kingdom.
393 – 358 - The reign of Bardyllis in Dardania 
335 – 295 - (approximately) The reign of Cleitus the Illyrian (the son of Bardyllis) in Dardania
295 – 290 – The reign of Bardylis II in Dardania 
231 – 206 – The reign of Longarus in Dardania 
206 – 176 – The reign of Bato of Dardania
 2nd century BC: The Roman Empire conquered Illyria in 168 BC. The Central Balkans was prior to the Roman conquest held by Illyrians, Thracians and Celts, while the Kosovo region was specifically inhabited by the Triballi, a Thracian tribe.
87–27 BC: The Dardani settled in the southwest of Triballi area in 87BC. The Dardani were possibly an Illyro-Thracian. Dardanians were defeated by Gaius Scribonius Curio and the Latin language was soon adopted as the main language of the tribe as many other conquered and Romanized. Eastern Dardania was Thracian throughout Roman rule. The Thracian place names survives the Romanization of the region.
6–9 – The great Great Illyrian Revolt against the Roman Empire
2nd century AD:
Ulpiana (later Byzantine Justiniana Secunda) is founded, most likely during the rule of Trajan. It was settled by Roman legionaries of unknown descent. The Romans colonized and founded several cities in the region.
Florus and Laurus, Constantinopolitan twin brothers that worked as stonemasons, are killed together with 300 fellow Christians after building a Church on the site of a Greek temple in Ulpiana. They were proclaimed Christians martyrs.
284: Emperor Diocletian established Dardania into a separate province out of territory of Moesia Superior with its capital at Naissus (Niš). However, in Ptolemy's Geographia (written in the 2nd century), Dardania is a separate unit.
4th century:
325: Bishops from Dardania and Macedonia Salutaris attend the Council of Nicaea, to deal with the Arian heresy.
343–344: Bishops from Dardania, New Epirus and Old Epirus attend the Council of Sardica.
5th century:
Christianity begins to spread throughout the region.
441: Invasion of Huns into Illyria.
479: Ulpiana is destroyed. King Theodemir sent his son Theodoric the Great with 3,000 soldiers to destroy the city.
6th century:
517: A "great barbarian incursion".
518: Earthquake, destroying 24 strongholds in Dardania.
fl. 535–565: Emperor Justinian I (r. 527–565) rebuilt Ulpiana, naming it Justiniana Secunda after founding Justiniana Prima in 535.
Slavs are mentioned in the Balkans during Justinian I rule (527–565), when eventually up to 100,000 Slavs raided Thessalonica. The Balkans were settled with "Sclaveni", in relation to the Antes which settled in Eastern Europe. Large scale Slavic settlement in the Balkans begins in the early 580s. The Slavs lived in the Sklavinia (lit. Slav lands).
fl. 893–927: the church in Sočanica is, at latest, built during the reign of Bulgar Simeon I. It was in use in the 11th and 12th centuries according to grave finds. In the reign of Grand Prince Uroš II, the site was known as Sečenica and was defended from the Byzantines from the newly built fortress at Galič, protecting the bridge over Ibar and the road to Ras. The site draws continuity with municipium Dardanorum.
ca 960: Constantine VII writes the De Administrando Imperio, in which "Serbia" has the city of Dresneïk, among others, possibly modern Drsnik, in Metohija.
ca 1090: Serbian Grand Prince Vukan (r. 1083–1112) began raiding Byzantine territory, first in the vicinity of Kosovo.
Between 1166 and 1168: Nemanja, a Serbian royalty who held parts of Kosovo and southern Serbia proper, defeats his older brother and Serbian Grand Prince Tihomir at Pantino (south of Zvečan), usurping the throne.
13th century:
between 1217 and 1235: The Peć metoh is founded by Saint Sava.
1253: the Serbian see was transferred from Žiča to the Monastery of Peć (future Patriarchate) by Archbishop Arsenije after a Hungarian invasion. The Serbian primates had since moved between the two.
In 1289–1290, the chief treasures of the ruined Žiča monastery, including the remains of Saint Jevstatije I, were transferred to Peja.

14th century
 1306: Our Lady of Ljeviš-monastery (UNESCO item) is built in Prizren by King Stephen Uroš II Milutin of Serbia (r. 1282–1321)
 1315: Church of Virgin Hodegetria is built in Mušutište by kaznac Jovan Dragoslav
 between 1313 and 1317: Banjska monastery and St. Stephen's church are built in Banjska, near Zvečan, by King Stephen Uroš II Milutin of Serbia (r. 1282–1321)
 1321: Gračanica monastery (UNESCO item) is built in Gračanica by King Stephen Uroš II Milutin.
 1325: First mention of Albanians in the region of Kosovo by Venetian Marino Sanudo.
 1327:
 Zočište Monastery is mentioned in Orahovac (thought to be built in the 12th century)
 The building of Visoki Dečani-monastery (UNESCO item) begins in Peja (finished 1335), by King Stephen Uroš III Dečanski of Serbia (r. 1322–1331)
 1330: The St. Saviour Church is built.
 between 1322 and 1331: Gorioč monastery is built in Istok, by King Stephen Uroš III Dečanski who also defeats the Bulgarians at Kyustendl(1330)
 1331: St. Nicholas Church, at the center of Prizren, is built.
 1343 -47 – Stephen Uroš IV Dušan of Serbia invades Albania
 1345–1371: Prizren acts as capital of the Serbian Empire.
 1345: King of Serbia Stefan Dušan around Christmas 1345. at a council meeting in Serres, which was conquered on 25 September 1345, proclaimed himself "Tsar of the Serbs and Romans" (Romans is equivalent to Greeks in Serbian documents).  The Serbian Orthodox Church becomes the Serbo-Greek Imperial Patriarchate, its spiritual capital being in Kosovo (Patriarchal Monastery of Peć).
 1347: The Saint Archangels Monastery is founded by Emperor Dušan.
 1352: As allies of Byzantine emperor John VI Kantakouzenos, the Ottomans defeat the Serbs at Didymoteicho
 between 1331 and 1355: Kmetovce monastery is built in Kmetovce, near Gnjilane, by Emperor Dušan
 1355: Emperor Dušan dies. Stefan Uroš V of Serbia assumes the throne of the Serbian Empire. Simeon Uroš declares himself the rival Emperor in Thessaly.
 1365: Prizren becomes part of King Vukašin's domain.
 1371:
26 September: The Battle of Maritsa against the Ottoman Empire, results in a defeat, in which Vukašin and Uglješa are killed.
4 December: Emperor Uroš V dies. The Nemanjić dynasty is left without an heir, and the Serbian Empire fragments into a conglomeration of principalities.
 Lazar Hrebeljanović, a Serbian magnate, becomes the most powerful of Serbian nobles. He conquers Priština, while his subordinate Đurađ I Balšić takes Prizren, which were held by Marko, the son of Vukašin. Lazar was born in Novo Brdo.
 1372: Đurađ I Balšić takes Peja, stripping most of Marko's lands north of Šar mountain.
 1375: In 1375 the Serbian Patriarch was forced to send a delegation to Constantinopole to appeal for the lifting of the schism from the Serbian Patriarchate of Peć that was established during the time of Dušan. In the last decade of the 14th century, Macedonia was already under Ottoman rule,
 1378: Vuk Branković, a subordinate to Lazar, holds all of modern Kosovo after the death of Đurađ I Balšić.
 1381: Draganac monastery in Prilepac is mentioned in edicts of Lazar
 1389:
 28 June [O.S. 15 June]: At the Kosovo field, the Serbian army led by Prince Lazar and Duke Vlatko Vuković fights the larger Ottoman army at the Battle of Kosovo. Casualties on both sides were extremely high – both leaders Lazar and Ottoman sultan Murad I died, together with most of the Serbian aristocracy. The southern provinces of the Serbian Empire were now in Ottoman hands, save for the Central Serbia, Montenegro and Bosnia, which would soon follow. The Battle has a notable place in Serbian history and culture.
 1389: Stefan Lazarević, the son of Lazar, succeeds as Prince (1389–1402) (see Serbian Despotate).
 1392: The Ottomans capture Skoplje (renaming it Üsküp). Vuk Branković, remembered in epic tradition as a traitor who slipped away from the Battle of Kosovo, was forced to become their vassal. Stefan Lazarević followed suit.
 1394: Stefan Lazarević participated in the Battle of Karanovasa as an Ottoman vassal.
 1395: Stefan Lazarević participated in the Battle of Rovine as an Ottoman vassal. Vuk Branković refused to participate.
 1396: The Battle of Nicopolis in 1396, widely regarded as the last large-scale crusade of the Middle Ages, failed to stop the advance of the victorious Ottomans. Vuk Branković refused to participate, and Bayezid I soon takes his lands and gives it to the Lazarević family, forcing Vuk to flee.
 6 October 1397: Vuk Branković dies in exile.

15th century
 1402: Stefan Lazarević, Prince (r. 1389–1402), assumes the title of Despot (r. 1402–1427). This took place after the Ottoman state temporarily collapsed following Mongol emir Timur's invasion of Anatolia (Battle of Ankara). The Ottoman interregnum lasted until 1413, as Bayezid's sons fought over succession.
 1402: In the feud between Ottoman vassal Đurađ Branković and his uncle Despot Stefan, Đurađ II Balšić sided with Stefan. Due to Đurađ II's support, Stefan defeated Ottoman forces led by Branković in the battle of Gračanica on the Kosovo field (21 June 1402) (.
 1412 After the battle of Angora in 1402, Prince Stefan took advantage of the chaos in the Ottoman state. In Constantinople he received the title of despot, and upon returning home, having defeated Brankovic's relatives he took control over the lands of his father. Despite frequent internal conflicts and his vassal obligations to the Turks and Hungarians, despot Stefan revived and economically consolidated the Serbian state, the center of which was gradually moving northward. Under his rule Novo Brdo in Kosovo became the economic center of Serbia where in he issued a Law of Mines in 1412 
 1412: Stefan Lazarević issued a Code of Mines in 1412 in Novo Brdo, the economic center of Serbia. In his legacy, Resava-Manasija monastery (Pomoravlje District), he organized the Resava School, a center for correcting, translating, and transcribing books.
 1413, 5 July: Musa Çelebi is killed, ending the Ottoman Interregnum with Mehmed Çelebi emerging as Sultan.
 1427 Stefan Lazarević died suddenly in 1427, leaving the throne to his nephew Đurađ Branković.
 1430 The whole of Macedonia was conquered by the Ottomans.
 1443, the Ottoman army was defeated, at the Serbian town of Niš, by a crusade under a multi-national leadership which included the Hungarian hero János Hunyadi. At this point Skanderbeg, an Albanian nobleman who had been trained as a soldier in the Ottoman army, raised a rebellion from his family seat at Kruja.
 1448 Battle of Kosovo (1448)
 1453 Fall of Constantinople in 1453.
 Between 1455 and 1459: Ottoman conquest of the Serbian Despotate. Prizren is conquered in 1455. The Monastery of the Holy Archangels is looted and destroyed. The Ottoman Sanjak of Prizren is established, existing until 1912.
 After 1455: Building of Namazgah Mosque. 
 1455 Building of Xhumasë Mosque.

16th century

 ca 1500: Building of "Maksut Pasha"-mosque, near the Marrash section just across the bridge. Still in use.
 1513: Building of Mosque "Suzi Prizreni" in Prizren.
 1526: Building of Mosque "Haxhi Kasami" at the Prizren fortress.
 1526: Building of Mosque of Haxhi Kasëmi (Toska), built between 1526 and 1533.
 1526: Building of Mosque of Jakup be Evrenozi.

 1534: (or 1543) Building of Mosque of Kuklibeu  also known as Kukli Bej Mosque (Xhamia e Saraçhanes/Sarachane) Kukli Beu Mosque or Kukli Bej's Mosque, Mosque from Mehmet Kukli Beg/Mehmeda Kuklji bega, 
 1534: (1534?) Building of "Iljaz Kukës"-Mosque in Prizren.
 1538: Mosque of the new neighborhood 1538.

 1543–1581: Building of Mosque of Muderis Ali Efendi
 Between 1545 and 1574: Building of the Bajrakli Mosque (also known as Mehmet Pasha's, Mehmed-Pašina). 
1555 – The first book in Albanian, Meshari, was published by Gjon Buzuku

 1562–1563: Building of Mustafa Pasha Mosque in Prizren. Destroyed in 1950 after a storm. At the location of the former UNMIK headquarters, now municipality building
 1566: Building of Mosque of Sejdi Beu.
 1576: Building of Sinan 1576 or 1589/1590
 1591: Building of Katip Sinan Qelebi Mosque in Prizren.
 1594: "Arasta (Evreson beu)"-Mosque built in 1594. Renovated in 1962

17th century

 1615 building of Sinan Pasha Mosque (Prizren)
 1646 Kaderi-Zingjirli 1646 or 1665
 1650 Mosque of Sejdi Beu t 1650
 1667 Great Turkish War 1667–1683
 1668 Sinan 1668 or 1706 
 1689–1692: Great Serb Migration.
 1689 Building of Mosque of Begzadës.
 1699 Mosque of Helveti Serezi by Osman Baba 1699/700

18th century

1701 – 04 – Albanian and Montenegrin assembly against Ottoman ruling.
 1739: The fall of the Habsburg Kingdom of Serbia (1718–1739) to the Ottomans triggered the Second Great Serb Migration into the (rest of the) Habsburg monarchy.
1785 – Large areas of Kosovo become part of the Pashalik of Scutari under Kara Mahmud Bushati.

19th century

 1800: Building of Budak Hoxha Mosque, Dragomani Mosque, Haxhi Ramadani Mosque, Tabakhanës Mosque.
 1808: Building of Markëllëq Mosque.
 1828: Building of Kalasë Mosque (destroyed in 1912).
 1830: Building of Kaderi Rezaki Mosque.
 1831: Building of Emin Pasha Rrotllësi Mosque.
 1833: Building of Hoqa Mahallës Mosque, of Mahmoud Pasha.
 1839 (3 November) – The decree of Tanzimat was announced,
 1843: Albanian Revolt of 1843–1844, directed against the Ottoman Tanzimat reforms which started in 1839 and were gradually being put in action.
 1850: Building of Bektashi Mosque.
 1856: Building of Episcopal Church of St. George, in Prizren.
 1863–65; Ottoman military expeditions in Kosovo 
 1867–68; Ottoman military expeditions in the Yakova Highlands 
 1870: Commission of the Cathedral of Our Lady of Perpetual Succour
 1871 Seminary in Prizren, established on 1 October 1871.
 1877 – Kosovo Vilayet was formed by the Ottoman Empire
 1878 (10 June) – The political organization, League of Prizren was formed 
 1878 (13 June – 13 July) – Congress of Berlin takes place
1878 (3–6 September) – Mehmed Ali Pasha, who was to overview the cession of the then-predominantly Albanian Plav-Gucia region to the Principality of Montenegro is killed during an attack undertaken by local committees of the League of Prizren.
1878 – 27 November – Planar meeting of the League of Prizren
1879 (Spring) – The journey of an Albanian delegation headed by Abdyl Frashëri in major capital cities of Europe to protect the Albanian issues of territory 
1880 (December) – Temporary Governance was announced in Prizren.
1881 - Turkish troops enter Ferizovik
1881 (21 April) - Battle of Štimlje and Slivova,
1881 (23 April) – Ottoman forces enter Prizren
1881 (8 May) – Ottoman forces recapture Đakovica from the League of Prizren
1885 – Revolt in Kosovo against Ottoman governance 
1889 – Azem Galica was born 
 1892: Building of Melami Mosque 
 1893: Building of Rufai Mosque 
 1895 - Shote Galica was born 
1897 – Revolt in Kosovo against Ottoman governance 
1899 – League of Peja was formed, led by Haxhi Zeka

20th century
 1903 – Revolt in Mitroviça
 1904 – Revolt in Kosovo 
 1908 – The Young Turk Revolution starts within the Ottoman Empire.
 1910 (1 – 3 May) – The Battle of Kacanik 
 1910 (May–June) -  New taxes levied in the early months of 1910 resulted with Albanian Revolt of 1910 which was suppressed within a month.
 1911 (24 March – 4 August) -  Albanian rebels in Kosovo Vilayet and Scutari Vilayet initiated Albanian Revolt of 1911 supported by the Kingdom of Montenegro and King Nikola Petrović who allowed the main headquarter of the rebellion to be in Podgorica. Balkan countries and Italy believed that Austria-Hungary was responsible for the revolt.
 1912 (January — August) – During Albanian Revolt of 1912 rebels managed to capture almost whole territory of the Kosovo Vilayet including its seat Skopje.
 1912 (April – May) – The armed struggles between Albanians and Ottoman forces in Kosovo 
 1912 (July) – Major cities in Kosovo fall into the hands of Albanian revolutionaries 
 1912 (4 September) – The Ottoman government ended the rebellion by agreeing to fulfill the rebels' demands which included establishing of the Albanian vilayet.
 1912 – The Balkan Wars begin as Montenegro and Serbia (followed by Bulgaria and Greece) declare war on the Ottoman Empire. The Balkan League besieges Constantinople. Serbia and Montenegro divide the Raška region, Albania and Kosovo, while Serbia also takes the offensive on Macedonia in the Battle of Kumanovo and the Battle of Monastir. The Ottoman Empire capitulates. 
 1912 – The Balkan Wars: the Kingdom of Serbia, Kingdom of Greece and Kingdom of Montenegro overrun almost all Albanian-populated territory in the hope of dividing the land amongst themselves. 
 1912 (28 November) – The independence of Albania is declared, claiming four vilayets including Kosovo.
1913: The Albanian state in finalised; Serbs, Greeks and Montenegrins withdraw. Kosovo has been divided between Serbia (the larger part) and Montenegro. All of this was ratified at the Treaty of London.
1918 (7 November) – Committee for the National Defence of Kosovo finalizes its formation 
1918: Serbia's absorption of Montenegro followed by its unification with the State of Slovenes, Croats and Serbs to form the first incarnation of Yugoslavia takes the territories of Kosovo with it into the new entity (ratified in various treaties throughout 1919 and 1920).
The time period, 1919 – 1926 was characterized by massive deportation of Kosovar Albanians 

1919 – 23,500 Kosovars emigrated to Turkey
1920 – 8,536 Kosovars emigrated to Turkey
1921 – 24,532 Kosovars emigrated to Turkey
1922 – 12,307 Kosovars emigrated to Turkey
1923 – 6,389 Kosovars emigrated to Turkey
1924 – 9,630 Kosovars emigrated to Turkey, 43 families immigrated to Albania
 1924 (25 May) – The armies of Bajram Curri start a revolt 
 1925 (29 March) – Bajram Curri is killed 
 1925 – 4,315 Kosovars immigrated to Turkey, 148 families immigrated to Albania
 1926 – 4,012 Kosovars immigrated to Turkey, 399 families immigrated to Albania
 1926 (20 November) – A revolt in Metohija begins.
The time period, 1927 – 36 was characterized by massive migrations of Kosovars 

1927 – 5,197 Kosovars emigrated to Turkey, 316 families immigrated to Albania
1928 – 4,326 Kosovars emigrated to Turkey, 149 families immigrated to Albania
1929 – 6,219 Kosovars emigrated to Turkey, 216 families immigrated to Albania
1930 – 13,215 Kosovars emigrated to Turkey, 199 families immigrated to Albania
1931 – 28,807 Kosovars emigrated to Turkey, 624 families immigrated to Albania
1932 – 6,219 Kosovars emigrated to Turkey, 211 families immigrated to Albania
1933 – 3,420 Kosovars emigrated to Turkey, 181 families immigrated to Albania
1934 – 14,500 Kosovars emigrated to Turkey, 328 families immigrated to Albania
1935 – 9,565 Kosovars emigrated to Turkey, 386 families immigrated to Albania
1936 – 4,252 Kosovars emigrated to Turkey, 182 families immigrated to Albania
1936 (January–February) – Oil Workers start a strike in Kosovo 
1937 – 4,234 Kosovars emigrated to Turkey
1938 – 7,251 Kosovars emigrated to Turkey, 4,046 families immigrated to Albania
1939 – 7,255 Kosovars emigrated to Turkey
7 April 1939: During World War II, the majority of Kosovo was part of the Italian occupation of Albania.
1940 – 6,792 Kosovars emigrated to Turkey
1941 (6 April) – The Invasion of Yugoslavia by Hitler's army 
September 1943: Kosovo becomes part of Nazi German occupied Albania.
1943 (16 September) - The Second League of Prizren took place, led by Bedri Pejani,
1944: The Democratic Federal Yugoslavia is created with the national boundary with Albania precisely as it had been prior to World War II.
1944 (2 January) – In the Assembly of Bujan, Kosovars declared that they are a political population and that they want to unite with Albania 
1944 (5 October) – The Fifth Brigade, and days later The Third Brigade of the Albanian army(UNÇSH), cross the state border to enslave Kosovo from enemy occupation 
1944 (23 October) – The Pristina Massacre 
1944 (7 November) – The liberation of Đakovica by the Albanian army 
1944 (18 November) – The final liberation of Dukagjin and Kosovo by the Albanian army 
1945: Kosovo as a political unit resurfaces for the first time since 1912. Now named the Autonomous Region of Kosovo and Metohija (1945–1963), the new entity exists as an autonomous region within the People's Republic of Serbia but it only occupies a fraction of the territory which had been Kosovo prior to 1912: whilst a part of the former vilayet remained within Central Serbia, the other lands were placed in the newly created Yugoslav republics of Montenegro and Macedonia (both outside of and equal partners to Serbia).
The time period, 1952 – 1965 was characterised by massive migrations of Kosovars 

1952 – 37,000 Kosovars emigrated to Turkey
1953 – 19,300 Kosovars emigrated to Turkey
1954 – 17,500 Kosovars emigrated to Turkey
1955 – 51,000 Kosovars emigrated to Turkey
1956 – 54,000 Kosovars emigrated to Turkey
1958 – 41,300 Kosovars emigrated to Turkey
1957 – 57,710 Kosovars emigrated to Turkey
1959 – 32,000 Kosovars emigrated to Turkey
1960 – 27,980 Kosovars emigrated to Turkey
1961 – 31,600 Kosovars emigrated to Turkey
1962 – 15,910 Kosovars emigrated to Turkey
1963 – 25,720 Kosovars emigrated to Turkey
1963: As a result of the new constitution, the Socialist Federal Republic of Yugoslavia is announced. Kosovo sees an increase in the level of self-rule, and was raised from region to province, as the Autonomous Province of Kosovo and Metohija (1963–1968)
1964 – 21,530 Kosovars emigrated to Turkey
1965 – 19,821 Kosovars emigrated to Turkey
1968 – A big wave of protests started in Kosovo and Europe (by Kosovars). Name of the province changed to Socialist Autonomous Province of Kosovo
1969 – 70 – The Universiteti i Prishtinës was founded 
1971: A higher level of autonomy is devolved to Kosovo's authorities.
1974 – The Socialist Autonomous Province of Kosovo significantly increased its autonomy within the Socialist Republic of Serbia
1974–(81) – Xhavit Nimani was elected president of the Socialist Autonomous Province of Kosovo 
1980 – The death of Josip Broz Tito Death and funeral of Josip Broz Tito
1981 (March) – Mass Albanian student protests in Pristina demand independence of Kosovo,
1981 – Population census (1,584,441 people were registered) 
1981–(82) – Ali Shukriu was elected president of the Socialist Autonomous Province of Kosovo 
1982-(83) - Kolë Shiroka was elected president of the Socialist Autonomous Province of Kosovo 
1983-(85) - Shefqet Nebih Gashi was elected president of the Socialist Autonomous Province of Kosovo 
1985–(86) – Branislav Skemberavić was elected president of the Socialist Autonomous Province of Kosovo 
1986 – Slobodan Milošević became the leader of Serbia and seized control of Kosovo,
1987 (24 April): As animosity between Serbs and Albanians in Kosovo had deepened during the 1980s, Slobodan Milošević was sent to address a crowd of Serbs in Kosovo Polje.
1989 – Slobodan Milošević drastically reduced Kosovo's special autonomous status within Serbia and started cultural oppression of the ethnical Albanian population
1989 (28 June) – Slobodan Milošević led a mass celebration with hundreds of thousands (almost one million) Serbs in Gazimestan on the 600th anniversary of a 1389
1990 (2 July) – The (self-declared) Kosovo parliament declared Kosovo a republic in Yugoslavia
22 September 1991: – The (self – declared) parliament declared Kosovo an independent country, The Republic of Kosovo
1992 (May) – Ibrahim Rugova was elected president, during its run the Republic of Kosovo was recognised only by Albania, it was formally disbanded in 1999 after the Kosovo War
1996–1999: Clashes between the KLA and the security forces of the Federal Republic of Yugoslavia intensify to become a full-scale war.
1998 – The Yugoslav government signs a cease fire and partial retreat monitored by Organization for Security and Co-operation in Europe (OSCE),
1998 (5, 6, 7 March) – The Jashari family was executed by Serbian police, 64 members of the Jashari family killed, including at least 24 women and children (see Attack on Prekaz),
1999 (January) – Račak massacre,
1999 (24 March) – NATO intervened in the war by bombing Yugoslavia 
10 June 1999: The Kosovo War comes to an end and Kosovo becomes a UN governed province under UNSC Resolution 1244, which is controlled by the United Nations Interim Administration Mission in Kosovo.
1999 (10 June) – UN Security Council passed UN Security Council Resolution 1244

21st century

2000 unrest in Kosovo
2001 – The Organization for Security and Co-operation in Europe OSCE supervised the first elections in the Kosovo Assembly and elected Ibrahim Rugova as president and Bajram Rexhepi as prime minister,
2004 unrest in Kosovo
2004 (October) – Wide Kosovo elections were held which resulted in Ramush Haradinaj becoming prime minister, while Ibrahim Rugova retained his position as president 
2006 (21 January) –The first president of Kosovo, Ibrahim Rugova died and was succeeded by Fatmir Sejdiu,
2006 (July) – First direct talks since 1999 between ethnic Serbian and Kosovar leaders on future status of Kosovo take place in Vienna.
2007 (February) – United Nations envoy Martti Ahtisaari unveils a plan to set Kosovo on a path to independence, which is immediately welcomed by Kosovo Albanians and rejected by Serbia.
2007 (17 November) – Parliamentary elections were held which resulted in Hashim Thaçi becoming prime minister and Fatmir Sejdiu as president. Hashim Thaçi stated his intention to declare the independence of Kosovo 
2008 unrest in Kosovo
2008 (16 February) – The European Union Rule of Law Mission in Kosovo is formed which slowly replaced UNMIK.
2008 – (17 February), 15:39 – The Republic of Kosovo declared its independence 
2008 (April) – Most of the member countries of NATO, EU, WEU, OECD have recognized Kosovo as a country 
2009 (21 January) – Kosovo Security Force is formed, a 2,500 strong NATO trained lightly armoured Security Force.
2009 (August) – Ethnic clashes break out in Mitrovica
2009 (November) – First post-independence local elections 
2010 (22 July) – International Court of Justice votes 10–4 in a non-binding advisory opinion that Kosovo's declaration of independence did not violate international law,
2010 (September) – President Fatmir Sejdiu resigns after court rules that he breached the constitution by staying in a party post while in office,
2010 (October) – Caretaker president Jakup Krasniqi calls early general election for February 2011. Fatmir Sejdiu's Democratic League of Kosovo (LDK) pulls out of governing coalition.
2011–13: North Kosovo crisis
2011 (22 February – 30 March) – Behgjet Pacolli becomes president after winning narrow majority in third round of voting in parliament. Hashim Thaçi is re-appointed as prime minister.
2011 (March) – Serbia and Kosovo begin direct talks to try end their dispute – their first talks since Kosovo broke away from Serbia.
2011 – President Pacolli steps down after the high court rules parliament had not been in quorum during his election. Parliament elects senior police officer Atifete Jahjaga to be Kosovo's first female president in April.
2013 January – EU-mediated talks resume between Kosovo and Serbia days after parliament in Belgrade approves support for minority Serb rights within Kosovo – de facto recognition of Kosovar sovereign territorial integrity.

See also 
Timeline of Albanian history
Timeline of Serbian history

References

Further reading
 

History of Kosovo
Kosovo
Years in Kosovo